Altered State is the debut record of the American progressive rock band Altered State, released August 27, 1991 on Warner Bros. Records. The album's first single, Step Into My Groove, received radio and MTV airplay along with two alternate versions of the song went to radio as well, the Psychedelic Mix and Psychedelic Instrumental recordings, produced by Ben Grosse.

The Los Angeles Times hailed the album as one of the Year's Best in 1991.

Bill Hard of The Hard Report dubbed the record one of the best of 1992.

Track listing 
"Step Into My Groove" (Markel/Moreland/Mathewson)
"Ghost Beside My Bed" (Markel)
"Heal Me" (Markel)
"Do What You Want" (Markel/Mathewson)
"Reunion" (Markel/Mathewson)
"One Small Boat" (Markel)
"Outside" (Markel)
"Surrender Now" (Markel/Mathewson)
"Drifting" (Markel/Mathewson/Moreland)
"Like Father"(Markel)
"Until The Music Ends" (Markel/Mathewson)

Personnel 
Gregory Markel: vocals, guitar
Curtis Mathewson: guitar, bass, vocals
Chip Moreland: drums, percussion, vocals

Additional personnel
 Tony Berg: guitar
 Nick South: bass
 Jonathan Melvoin: percussion

Production 
 Tony Berg: Producer
 Bob Clearmountain: Mixer
 Susan Rogers: Engineer
Ken Jordan: Engineer
Jeffrey Lord-Alge: Engineer
Susan Rogers: Engineer
Assistant Engineers: George Cowen, Gina Immel, Neil Azron, Chris Steinmetz and Red Relasatte
Designer: John Van Hammersveld
Recorded at: Sunset Sound, Cherokee, Zeitgist, A&M, Acme, Studio 55 and Rumbo
Mixed in: Bearsville, New York

References 

1991 debut albums
Albums produced by Tony Berg
Warner Records albums
Altered State (band) albums